This glossary contains terms specific to dyeing. For terms used in the creation or manufacturing of textiles, including spinning, knitting, weaving, and individual fabrics and finishing processes, see Glossary of textile manufacturing. For terms used in sewing and tailoring, see Glossary of sewing terms. For biological and medical applications of dyeing, see Staining and Biological Stain Commission.
Dyeing is the craft of imparting colors to textiles in loose fiber, yarn, cloth or garment form by treatment with a dye. Archaeologists have found evidence of textile dyeing with natural dyes dating back to the Neolithic period. In China, dyeing with plants, barks and insects has been traced back more than 5,000 years. Natural insect dyes such as Tyrian purple and kermes and plant-based dyes such as woad, indigo and madder were important elements of the economies of Asia and Europe until the discovery of man-made synthetic dyes in the mid-19th century. Synthetic dyes quickly superseded natural dyes for the large-scale commercial textile production enabled by the industrial revolution, but natural dyes remained in use by traditional cultures around the world.

A

B

C

D

F

G

I

K

L

M

N

O

P

Q

R

S

T

W

Y

See also
 List of dyes

Notes

References
 
 

 
 
 
 
 
 
 
 
 
 
 
 
 
 

Dyes
Dyeing
 dye
Wikipedia glossaries using description lists